Aralu may refer to:
 Oroxylum indicum, a flowering plant commonly called midnight horror or Indian trumpet flower used in traditional medicine
 Terminalia chebula, a tree native to south or southeast Asia commonly known as black- or chebulic myrobalan

See also
 Myrobalans (disambiguation)